Sir Donald Collin Cumyn Luddington,  (18 August 1920 – 26 January 2009) was a British colonial government official and civil servant who served firstly in the Hong Kong Government and became District Commissioner, New Territories and the Secretary for Home Affairs successively, during which he had also served as an official member of the Legislative Council. He was later promoted to Oceania and was High Commissioner for the Western Pacific and Governor of the Solomon Islands during the period from 1973 to 1976. He returned to Hong Kong in 1977 to replace Sir Ronald Holmes as chairman of the Public Service Commission. He was the second person, after Sir Jack Cater, to hold the post of Commissioner of ICAC from 1978 until his retirement in 1980.

Biography

Early years
Luddington was born on 18 August 1920 in Edinburgh, Scotland. His father, Norman John Luddington, was a civil servant in British Ceylon and his mother was Myrtle Amethyst Payne. He studied at Dover College and then the University of St Andrews, where he obtained a MA degree.

From 1940 to 1946, he served in the British Army and fought in the Second World War. He was initially commissioned as a second lieutenant in the King's Own Yorkshire Light Infantry (KOYLI) on 28 December 1940, and transferred to the Royal Armoured Corps (RAC) on 22 October 1941. He saw action in India and Arakan, Burma amongst others, and was Mentioned in Despatches on 5 April 1945. By that time he was a lieutenant, he continued to hold his emergency commission until 19 July 1952 when he transferred to the Reserve of Officers, and was granted the honorary rank of captain.

Colonial services
In February 1949, Luddington arrived at Hong Kong as a Colonial Service cadet and began his career as an official in Hong Kong. He was initially sent to Tai Po as a District Officer and later served in various government departments, including the Secretariat for Chinese Affairs, the Hong Kong Police Force, the Colonial Secretariat, and the Commerce and Industry Department. Apart from that, he also served in the Royal Hong Kong Regiment from 1949 to 1955. In November 1960, he was appointed Defence Secretary and principal assistant colonial secretary and was responsible for overseeing the security issues of Hong Kong. He later served successively as Deputy Secretary for Home Affairs and Deputy Director of Commerce and Industry in the mid-1960s and became a member of the Hong Kong Management Association. In April 1969, Luddington replaced Kenneth Strathmore Kinghorn as District Commissioner, New Territories, thus becoming an official member of the Legislative Council appointed by then Governor Sir David Trench under the approval from the Queen. In June that year he was further appointed as an official Justice of the Peace.

In May 1971, Luddington succeeded (later Sir) Ronald Holmes as the Secretary for Home Affairs and became a principal government official. However, as Rafael Hui, a former junior colleague to Luddington recalled, he was too upright, and therefore, was not on very good terms with the diplomat-turned-new-governor, Sir Murray MacLehose. It was said that in one occasion MacLehose had ordered something for Luddington's subordinates to follow-up. Nevertheless, Luddington deemed the diplomatic-like orders were nonsense and dismissed all of them. As a result, in May 1973, he was "promoted" to Oceania by the Governor. He was appointed High Commissioner for the Western Pacific on 10 October 1973, and his major duty was to administer a small and remote British colony, the British Solomon Islands. Yet, to let Luddington leave Hong Kong with dignity, he was appointed Companion of the Order of St Michael and St George before being appointed as high commissioner. On 21 August 1974, he was further appointed as Governor of the British Solomon Islands Protectorate and he continued to serve this position until January 1976. After that the position of high commissioner for the Western Pacific was abolished, and thus he was the last person to hold this post.

During his term as governor, he entertained Queen Elizabeth II and Prince Philip in their royal visit to the Solomon Islands in February 1974. He was subsequently appointed Commander of the Royal Victorian Order for his hospitality to the Queen. Furthermore, under his supervision, a new constitution was adopted in 1974 establishing a parliamentary democracy and ministerial system of government for the colony. In mid-1975, the name "Solomon Islands" officially replaced that of "British Solomon Islands Protectorate" which paved way for the colony to self-government and independence. Luddington left the governorship in January 1976 and self-government was established immediately. Two years later, the Solomon Islands gained independence from the United Kingdom as a Commonwealth realm. Luddington was appointed Knight Commander of the Order of the British Empire in the Queen's Birthday Honours in June 1976 for his services to Oceania.

In May 1977, Sir Donald returned to Hong Kong to succeed Sir Ronald Holmes as chairman of the Public Service Commission. He left the post in March 1978 but was appointed to replace Jack Cater as the second Commissioner of ICAC by Governor MacLehose on 4 July in the same year. During his term as the Commissioner, he strove to improve the stained relationship between the ICAC and the Royal Hong Kong Police Force and built up the ICAC's public reputation for devotion to anti-corruption. He finally retired from the government in November 1980.

Later years
Luddington spent his later years in retirement in Easingwold, Yorkshire. He died in a hospital in Harrogate on 26 January 2009 at the age of 88. He died the last surviving former high commissioner for the Western Pacific. On his death, Hong Kong Chief Executive Donald Tsang and ICAC Commissioner Timothy Tong both sent condolences and praised Luddington's contribution to Hong Kong.

Family
Luddington was married to Garry Brodie Johnston, in 1945. The couple had one son and one daughter. Lady Luddington once served as the Vice President of the Hong Kong Girl Guides Association. She died on 4 November 2002. Sir Donald's hobbies included reading and walking. He was a member of the Royal Commonwealth Society and the Hong Kong Club.

Honours

Conferment
 Official Justice of the Peace (June 1969)
 Companion of the Order of St Michael and St George (2 June 1973)
 Commander of the Royal Victorian Order (21 February 1974)
 Knight Commander of the Order of the British Empire (12 June 1976)

Titles
 Donald Luddington (18 August 1920 – April 1969)
 The Honourable Donald Luddington (April 1969 – June 1969)
 The Honourable Donald Luddington, JP (June 1969 – April 1971)
 Donald Luddington, JP (April 1971 – May 1971)
 The Honourable Donald Luddington, JP (May 1971 – May 1973)
 Donald Luddington (May 1973 – 2 June 1973)
 Donald Luddington, CMG (2 June 1973 – 21 February 1974)
 Donald Luddington, CMG, CVO (21 February 1974 – 12 June 1976)
 Sir Donald Luddington, KBE, CMG, CVO (12 June 1976 – 26 January 2009)

See also
 Independent Commission Against Corruption (Hong Kong)
 Solomon Islands
 David Jeaffreson

See also
 Video of Sir Donald at Honiara on the US Bicentennial

Footnotes

References

English materials

 Edited by Kevin Sinclair, Who's Who in Hong Kong, Hong Kong: SCMP, 1979.
 Who's Who, London: A & C Black, 2008. 
 "Donald Luddington: Obituary", Yorkshire Post, 29 January 2009.
 "Former ICAC chief dies in Britain", South China Morning Post CITY3, 4 February 2009.
 "British Western Pacific Territories", World Statesmen.org, retrieved on 5 February 2009.
 "Index Lo-Ly", rulers.org, retrieved on 5 February 2009.
 "Solomon Islands", World Statesmen.org, retrieved on 5 February 2009.
 "South Pacific realms", The Monarchy Today, retrieved on 5 February 2009.

Chinese materials
 〈景韓任市政局長〉，《工商日報》第五頁，1960年11月26日。
 〈薜畿輔接長警務處〉，《工商日報》第四頁，1968年12月13日。
 〈黎敦義繼陸鼎堂任新界民政署長〉，《工商日報》第二十頁，1971年4月1日。
 〈姬達獲委任布政司〉，《工商日報》第八頁，1978年7月1日。
 《公務員敘用委員會二零零零年年報》，香港：香港政府，2000年。
 〈歷任廉政專員〉，《凝聚群力，共建廉政》，香港：廉政公署，2004年。
 〈重原則 有性格 佩服兩「恐龍師父」〉，香港《文匯報》，2005年11月4日。
 〈行政長官對陸鼎堂爵士逝世深切哀悼〉，《新聞公報》，香港：香港政府，2009年2月3日。
 〈前廉政專員陸鼎堂逝世〉，《蘋果日報》，2009年2月4日。
 〈女童軍歷史〉，《香港女童軍總會》網頁，造訪於2009年2月5日。

External links
 Sir Donald Luddington—Sir Donald Luddington, who died on 26 January aged 88, was a Hong Kong civil servant who became head of the crown colony's Independent Commission Against Corruption, and, as Governor, guided the Solomon Islands towards independence.  The Daily Telegraph, 11 February 2009.
 CE grieved by death of Sir Donald Luddington, HKSAR Government Press Release, 3 February 2009
 ICAC statement, 3 February 2009

1920 births
2009 deaths
Colonial Administrative Service officers
Royal Armoured Corps officers
Government officials of Hong Kong
Members of the Legislative Council of Hong Kong
Knights Commander of the Order of the British Empire
Commanders of the Royal Victorian Order
Companions of the Order of St Michael and St George
King's Own Yorkshire Light Infantry officers
British Army personnel of World War II
Alumni of the University of St Andrews
People from Easingwold
Politicians from Edinburgh
People educated at Dover College
Members of the Urban Council of Hong Kong
Governors of the Solomon Islands
High Commissioners for the Western Pacific
British expatriates in Hong Kong